Paolo Guastalvino (born 23 June 1979) is an Italian former footballer who played as a defender.

Career
Guastalvino started his career at hometown club Perugia. in 1998 he joined Ancona.

Vicenza
In summer 2001 Guastalvino was signed by Parma for undisclosed fee along with Andrea Staffolani (1.5 billion lire) but re-sold to Vicenza in co-ownership deal for 2.5 billion lire (€1,291,142). Guastalvino played 28 games in 2001–02 Serie B. Guastalvino was signed by Vicenza outright in June 2002 for undisclosed fee and Parma signed half of Christian Maggio for 4 billion lire (€2,065,827). However, in the next 3 seasons he played a total of 29 games only.

Lega Pro clubs
Guastalvino left Vicenza in 2005. He played for Sambenedettese and Benevento respectively in 2005–06 season. In August 2006 he settled in Foligno. The club won 2006–07 Serie C2 group B and finished last in 2007 Supercoppa di Lega di Seconda Divisione. He played for the club in Italian third division for 3 seasons, all secured the seat for the next season.

Serie D clubs
In the summer of 2010 he moved down 2 divisions to Serie D club Castel Rigone for the 2010–11 Serie D season, located in his home province – the province of Perugia.

Honours
Foligno
 Serie C2: 2006–07

References

External links
 Serie B profile (data by Panini Digital) 

Italian footballers
A.C. Perugia Calcio players
A.C. Ancona players
Parma Calcio 1913 players
L.R. Vicenza players
A.S. Sambenedettese players
Benevento Calcio players
A.S.D. Città di Foligno 1928 players
Serie B players
Association football defenders
Sportspeople from Perugia
1979 births
Living people
Footballers from Umbria